Holning S. Lau is an American lawyer, currently the Reef C. Ivey II Distinguished Professor of Law at University of North Carolina School of Law.

Education
J.D., University of Chicago
B.A., University of Pennsylvania

References

Year of birth missing (living people)
Living people
University of North Carolina School of Law faculty
American lawyers
University of Chicago Law School alumni
University of Pennsylvania alumni